Li Xiaoxia (born 16 January 1988) is a Chinese table tennis Grand Slam champion.

Career
She trained in the Jiangsu Wuxi Shanhe Club in Wuxi, China. Her trainer is Li Sun, who is also the mentor of Olympic gold medal winner Zhang Yining. As of April 2011, she occupies the top place on the ITTF women's world ranking. In terms of achievements, she is one of the most successful female table tennis players (alongside Ding Ning, Deng Yaping, Wang Nan, Zhang Yining) having won the gold medal in each of the Table Tennis World Cup, the Table Tennis World Championships, and the Olympic Games.

In January 2017, she announced her retirement on social media website Weibo, stating "I have to say goodbye to you even though I feel it a pity to do so. Goodbye, my beloved table tennis. Goodbye, my prestigious Chinese team."

Career records
Singles (as of July 23, 2011)
Olympic Games: winner (2012).
World Championships: winner (2013); runner-up (2007, 11); semi-finalist (2009, 2015).
World Cup appearances: 5. Record: winner (2008); runner-up (2011, 14); 3rd (2009).
Pro Tour winner (9): China (Shenzhen) Open 2005; Qatar, German, Swedish Open 2007; Singapore, China (Shanghai) Open 2008; China Open 2010, China (Shanghai) Open 2012, Kuwait Open 2016 Runner-up (5): Qatar Open 2006; Kuwait, Japan Open 2008; Slovenian, German Open 2011.
Pro Tour Grand Finals appearances: 3. Record: winner (2007); runner-up (2006).
Asian Games: winner (2010).
Asian Championships: runner-up (2007, 09).
Asian Cup: 2nd (2005).

Women's Doubles
World Championships: winner (2009, 11); runner-up (2007, 15).
Pro Tour winner (18): China (Wuxi), Austrian Open 2004; Slovenian Open 2006; Croatian, Qatar, Kuwait, Japan, China (Nanjing), German Open 2007; China (Suzhou) Open 2009; China, Austrian Open 2010; Slovenian, Qatar, UAE, German, Austrian Open 2011; Japan Open 2016 Runner-up (15): Egypt, German, Dutch, Polish, Danish Open 2002; Croatian, China (Kunshan), China (Guangzhou) Open 2006; Slovenian Open 2007; Korea, China (Shanghai) Open 2008; English, China (Suzhou) Open 2011; China (Shanghai) Open 2012; Kuwait Open 2016
Pro Tour Grand Finals appearances: 3. Record: winner (2007, 2011); SF (2006).
Asian Games: winner (2006, 10).
Asian Championships: winner (2007, 09).

Mixed Doubles
Asian Championships: winner (2009); SF (2005).
World Junior Championships: winner (2003)

Team
Olympic Games: Winner (2012, 2016)
World Championships: winner (2006, 08, 12); runner-up (2010).
World Team Cup: 1st (2007, 09, 10, 11).
Asian Games: 1st (2006, 10).
Asian Championships: 1st (2003, 07, 09).

References

External links
 
 
 
 
 
 

1988 births
Living people
Table tennis players from Anshan
Asian Games medalists in table tennis
Table tennis players at the 2012 Summer Olympics
Table tennis players at the 2016 Summer Olympics
Olympic table tennis players of China
Olympic medalists in table tennis
2016 Olympic gold medalists for China
2016 Olympic silver medalists for China
Medalists at the 2012 Summer Olympics
Table tennis players at the 2010 Asian Games
Table tennis players at the 2006 Asian Games
Chinese female table tennis players
Medalists at the 2006 Asian Games
Medalists at the 2010 Asian Games
Asian Games gold medalists for China
World Table Tennis Championships medalists
21st-century Chinese women